The pastorela ("little/young shepherdess") was an Occitan lyric genre used by the troubadours. It gave rise to the Old French pastourelle. The central topic was always the meeting of a knight with a shepherdess, which could lead to any of a number of possible conclusions. They were usually humorous pieces. The genre was allegedly invented by Cercamon, whose examples do not survive, and was most famously taken up by his (alleged) pupil Marcabru.

Table of pastorelas
Only a few pastorelas have survived; Audiau counts 24 "true" Old Occitan examples, mentioning 10 others which resemble them but belong to other genres and one which is a translation from French. Zemp reduces this number further, to 17.

Notes

References
Jeanroy, Alfred. La poésie lyrique des troubadours. Toulouse: Privat, 1934.

Western medieval lyric forms
Occitan literary genres